"Back on the Road" is an English-language song by the Norwegian urban duo Madcon released from their second album, So Dark the Con of Man, featuring vocals from Paperboys. The song was written by "3Elementz", Madcon, Vagabond and produced by 3Elementz. It was released in 2008. The song reached no. 6 in Norway and no. 66 in Germany.

Track listing

Credits and personnel
Lead vocals – Madcon
Music – 3Elementz, Madcon, Vagabond
Lyrics – 3Elementz, Madcon, Vagabond
Producer – 3Elementz

Chart performance

Year-end charts

References

2008 singles
2008 songs